Yarem Qayah or Yaremqayeh or Yarem Qayyah or Yarem Qiyeh, also rendered as Yarim Qiyeh or Yarim Ghiyeh  may refer to:
 Yarem Qayah-e Olya
 Yarem Qayah-e Sofla
 Yarem Qayah-e Vasat